Diego Ignacio Torres Quintana (born 31 July 1992) is a Chilean footballer who plays for Audax Italiano as a midfielder.

Career
He made his senior debut in Primera División for Palestino on May 19, 2012, when he came on as a substitute in the second half against La Serena.

Honours
Palestino
 Copa Chile (1): 2018

References

External links
 

1992 births
Living people
People from Santiago
People from Santiago Province, Chile
People from Santiago Metropolitan Region
Footballers from Santiago
Chilean footballers
Chilean Primera División players
Segunda División Profesional de Chile players
Club Deportivo Palestino footballers
San Antonio Unido footballers
Audax Italiano footballers
C.D. Antofagasta footballers
Association football midfielders